Stanley Yau Sze-chun (born 20 August 1990), better known mononymously as Stanley, is a Hong Kong singer, dancer, actor, and a member of the Hong Kong boy group Mirror. Apart from his group activities, Stanley has starred in television dramas, such as Who Sells Bricks in Hong Kong (2020) (Chinese: 地產仔) and Ossan's Love (2021).

Life and career
Stanley was born on 20 August 1990 and grew up in Ma On Shan of New Territories, Hong Kong. He attended the Mrs Fung Ping Shan Primary School, Po Leung Kuk Wu Chung College, and graduated from the City University of Hong Kong. Stanley was part of the Chestnuts Dance Crew, choreographing dance covers to popular music. As a member of Chestnuts, Stanley also worked as a backup dancer for singers Sandy Lam, Aaron Kwok and Pakho Chau.

In 2018, Stanley auditioned for ViuTV's reality talent competition Good Night Show - King Maker and finished tenth place, earning him a spot in the twelve-member boy group Mirror. The group debuted on 3 November 2018 with the single "In a Second" . That same year, Stanley debuted in the comedy drama Being an Actor (2018), portraying Sammy in episode one. 

Stanley had a larger supporting role in the sitcom Showman Show (2019), continuing his role as a passionate production assistant from Being an Actor. He then starred as Luk Chun in Who Sells Bricks in Hong Kong (2020), Chang Ching-Yao in HBO Asia's Trinity of Shadows (2021), and Louis in Ossan's Love (2021).

Filmography

Television dramas

Variety shows

Film

MV Appearance (Actor)

Discography

Singles

As lead artist

References

External links
 Stanley Yau on Instagram
 

1990 births
Living people
King Maker contestants
Mirror (group) members
Hong Kong male television actors
Hong Kong television personalities
21st-century Hong Kong male singers
Hong Kong idols
Alumni of the City University of Hong Kong